Harold Donald Davies (1888 – 1958) was an English footballer who played for Stoke.

Career
Davies was born in Pendleton, Lancashire and played amateur football with Lancaster Wanderers before joining Stoke in 1913. He played in one first team match which came in a 5–1 win over Treharris Athletic during the 1913–14 season before returning to amateur football with North Staffs Nomads.

Career statistics

References

1888 births
1958 deaths
Sportspeople from Lancashire
English footballers
Association football midfielders
Stoke City F.C. players
Southern Football League players